Country Code: +691
International Call Prefix: 011

National Significant Numbers (NSN): seven-digits

Format: +691 yyy xxxx

Areas in the Federated States of Micronesia 
The number ranges before 2003 were:

The new number ranges after 2003 are:

See also 
 Telecommunications in the Federated States of Micronesia

References

Federated States of Micronesia
Communications in the Federated States of Micronesia